The Armenian school in Nicosia, as of 1972 called "Nareg", after Saint Krikor Naregatsi, is located on 47, Armenia street in Strovolos, Nicosia, between the Armenian Prelature of Cyprus building and the Sourp Asdvadzadzin church. The current building was built between 1971 and 1972 by the Technical Services of the Ministry of Education and was inaugurated on 12 November 1972 by Archbishop Makarios III and Catholicos Khoren I of Cilicia. Currently, the school has about 110 students. As all other Nareg Schools (Nicosia, Larnaca, Limassol), it is under a single principal, as of 2009 Vera Tahmazian, and under the tutelage of the Nareg Armenian Schools Committee. Additionally, since 2005, following the unjust closure of the Melkonian Educational Institute, there are currently 16 students at the Nareg Gymnasium (Junior High School).

The first Armenian school in Nicosia was established on Victoria street in 1870 by Archimandrite Vartan Mamigonian. In 1886, priest Hovhannes Shahinian renovated the building and called it "Vartanants Boys' School". In 1902 Archimandrite Bedros Saradjian erected the "Shoushanian Girls' School". The two schools operated simultaneously, until in 1921, following the death of local landowner Artin Bey Melikian, his children respected his will for the erection of the co-educational "Melikian National School". Initially, the school building was considered too big, but a year later it was full of Armenian genocide survivors. In 1938 Dickran Ouzounian erected the also co-educational "Ouzounian National School". As of 1939, the two schools assumed the name "Melikian-Ouzounian National School", under which they operated until 1963. In 1950 the new kindergarten building was built. The school premises were taken over by Turkish Cypriots during the Cyprus crisis of 1963–64, and then placed in the Turkish Cypriot part of the city after its division. For a month no classes took place, but as of February 1964 the school was housed at the Mitsis building on Archbishop Makarios III Avenue until June 1964. From September 1964 until June 1972, school life continued in two pre-fabricated buildings on the grounds of the Melkonian Educational Institute stadium, until the current premises were erected, thanks to the initiative of Representative Dr. Antranik L. Ashdjian, on land that was given to the community in 1966, thanks to the efforts of Representative Berge Tilbian.

The new auditorium was built between 2008–2010 and was inaugurated on 17 May 2011 by Minister of Education and Culture Dr Andreas Demetriou.

References

Armenian diaspora in Cyprus
High schools and secondary schools in Cyprus
Armenian schools